Dirty socks may refer to:

Smelly socks
Dirty Socks Spring, a spring in California